Westminster High School may refer to:

Westminster High School (Manila)
Westminster High School (Westminster, California)
Westminster High School (Westminster, Colorado)
The Westminster Schools, Atlanta, Georgia
Westminster Senior High School, Westminster, Maryland  
Westminster School (Connecticut), a private coeducational boarding and day school for students in grades 9–12 and Postgraduate, in Simsbury, Connecticut